Pak Tam Chung is an area in the southern part of the Sai Kung Peninsula in the New Territories of Hong Kong. It is administratively under the Sai Kung District.

Features
Pak Tam Chung was described as consisting of six villages in 1911 with fewer than 405 inhabitants: Wong Yi Chau, Pak Tam, Sheung Yiu, Tsak Yue Wu, Wong Keng Tei and Tsam Chuk Wan. The six villages were all inhabited by Hakka people, with the exception of two hamlets in Pak Tam.

There is a visitor centre for nature education set up by the Hong Kong Government. Near the centre is a vehicle barrier leading to the restricted portion of Sai Kung East Country Park in Pak Tam Chung. For vehicles, only those with authorisation can enter the area and reach places like Hoi Ha, Pak Tam Au and High Island Reservoir.

There are a number of picnic and barbecue facilities within Pak Tam Chung, including a site designed for physically disabled visitors.

Po Leung Kuk owns a holiday camp site in Pak Tam Chung, the Po Leung Kuk Pak Tam Chung Camp.

See also 
 Sheung Yiu Folk Museum
 Historic churches of Sai Kung Peninsula
 Sai Kung Town
 Tai Po District

References

External links

 Delineation of area of existing village Pak Tam Chung (Sai Kung) for election of resident representative (2019 to 2022)

Places in Hong Kong
Sai Kung Peninsula